JFF may refer to:
 Jagran Film Festival, India
 Jamaica Football Federation
 Jacksonville Film Festival, United States
 Warsaw Jewish Film Festival, Poland
 Zagreb Jewish Film Festival, Croatia